Pardy is a surname. Notable people with the surname include:

 Adam Pardy (born 1984), ice hockey player
 Henry Garfield Pardy, Canadian diplomat
 James Vincent Pardy (1898–1983), American-born Catholic missionary and bishop in South Korea
 Marion Pardy (born 1942), 37th Moderator of the United Church of Canada
 Rick Pardy (born 1961), American football coach

See also
 Pardi
 Party (disambiguation)
 Purdy (disambiguation)